Steve Crowell is an American politician. He has represented the 3rd district in the Arkansas Senate since January 2023.

Life and career 
Crowell attended Mankota State University. He was a member of the Magnolia City Council.

In May 2022, Crowell defeated Charles Beckham in the Republican primary election for the 3rd district of the Arkansas Senate. No candidate was nominated to challenge him in the general election.

References 

Living people
Place of birth missing (living people)
Year of birth missing (living people)
Republican Party Arkansas state senators
21st-century American politicians